Wigston is a town in England.

Wigston may also refer to:

Wigston Parva 
South Wigston
William Wigston (disambiguation)